The Fries rearrangement, named for the German chemist Karl Theophil Fries, is a rearrangement reaction of a phenolic ester to a hydroxy aryl ketone by catalysis of Lewis acids.

It involves migration of an acyl group of phenol ester to the aryl ring. The reaction is ortho and para selective and one of the two products can be favoured by changing reaction conditions, such as temperature and solvent.

Mechanism
Despite many efforts, a definitive reaction mechanism for the Fries rearrangement has not been determined. Evidence for inter- and intramolecular mechanisms have been obtained by crossover experiments with mixed reactants. The reaction progress is not dependent on solvent or substrate. A widely accepted mechanism involves a carbocation intermediate.  

In the first reaction step a Lewis acid for instance aluminium chloride  co-ordinates to the carbonyl oxygen atom of the acyl group. This oxygen atom is more electron rich than the phenolic oxygen atom and is the preferred Lewis base. This interaction polarizes the bond between the acyl residue and the phenolic oxygen atom and the aluminium chloride group rearranges to the phenolic oxygen atom. This generates a free acylium carbocation which reacts in a classical electrophilic aromatic substitution with the aromatic ring. The abstracted proton is released as hydrochloric acid where the chlorine is derived from aluminium chloride. The orientation of the substitution reaction is temperature dependent. A low reaction temperature favors para substitution and with high temperatures the ortho product prevails, this can be rationalised as exhibiting classic thermodynamic versus kinetic reaction control as the ortho product can form a more stable bidentate complex with the aluminium. Formation of the ortho product is also favoured in non-polar solvents; as the solvent polarity increases, the ratio of the para product also increases.

Scope
Phenols react to form esters instead of hydroxyarylketones when reacted with acyl halides under Friedel-Crafts acylation conditions. Therefore, this reaction is of industrial importance for the synthesis of hydroxyarylketones, which are important intermediates for several pharmaceuticals. As an alternative to aluminium chloride, other Lewis acids such as boron trifluoride and bismuth triflate or strong protic acids such as hydrogen fluoride and methanesulfonic acid can also be used. In order to avoid the use of these corrosive and environmentally unfriendly catalysts altogether research into alternative heterogeneous catalysts is actively pursued.

Limits
In all instances only esters can be used with stable acyl components that can withstand the harsh conditions of the Fries rearrangement. If the aromatic or the acyl component is heavily substituted then the chemical yield will drop due to steric constraints. Deactivating meta-directing groups on the benzene group will also have an adverse effect  as can be expected for a Friedel–Crafts acylation.

Photo-Fries rearrangement
In addition to the ordinary thermal phenyl ester reaction a photochemical variant is possible. The photo-Fries rearrangement can likewise give [1,3] and [1,5] products, which involves a radical reaction mechanism. This reaction is also possible with deactivating substituents on the aromatic group. Because the yields are low this procedure is not used in commercial production. However, photo-Fries rearrangement may occur naturally, for example when a plastic object made of aromatic polycarbonate, polyester or polyurethane, is exposed to the sun (aliphatic carbonyls undergo Norrish reactions, which are somewhat similar). In this case, photolysis of the ester groups would lead to leaching of phthalate from the plastic.

Anionic Fries rearrangement 
In the anionic Fries rearrangement ortho-metalation of aryl esters, carbamates and carbonates with a strong base results in a rearrangement to give ortho-carbonyl species.

See also 
Friedel–Crafts alkylation-like reactions:
 Hofmann–Martius rearrangement
 Fischer–Hepp rearrangement
 Duff reaction

References 

Rearrangement reactions
Name reactions
Free radical reactions